Steinbrenner is a surname. Notable people with the name include:

Gene Steinbrenner (1892–1972), American baseball player
George Steinbrenner (1930–2010), American businessman and owner of New York Yankees baseball team
Hal Steinbrenner (born 1969), American businessman and part-owner of the New York Yankees baseball team
Hank Steinbrenner (1957–2020), American businessman and part-owner of the New York Yankees baseball team
Hans Steinbrenner (sculptor) (1928-2008), German painter and sculptor
Hans Steinbrenner (SS member) (1905-1964), German concentration camp overseer
Joan Steinbrenner (1935–2018), American vice-chair of the New York Yankees baseball team
Sophia Steinbrenner (died 1933), American businesswoman

See also 
 Steinbrenner family

Surnames of German origin